The Searching Soul is a 1925 German silent film directed by Rudolf Biebrach and starring Lucy Doraine.

The film's sets were designed by the art director Carl Ludwig Kirmse.

Cast

References

Bibliography

External links

1925 films
Films of the Weimar Republic
Films directed by Rudolf Biebrach
German silent feature films
German black-and-white films